Nutakki or Nuthakki (Telugu: నూతక్కి) is a village in Mangalagiri mandal in Guntur district of Andhra Pradesh.

Nutakki is an Indian surname:

 Nuthakki Bhanu Prasad - was an Indian chemical engineer, bureaucrat and a former chairman of the Oil and Natural Gas Commission.
 Nutakki Priyanka, is an Indian Woman International Master 
 Nutakki Ramaseshaiah - was an Indian lawyer, politician and Member of Parliament.

Indian surnames